Ciramadol (WY-15,705) is an opioid analgesic that was developed in the late 1970s and is related to phencyclidine, tramadol, tapentadol and venlafaxine. It is a mixed agonist-antagonist for the μ-opioid receptor with relatively low abuse potential and a ceiling on respiratory depression which makes it a relatively safe drug. It has a slightly higher potency and effectiveness as an analgesic than codeine, but is weaker than morphine.  Other side effects include sedation and nausea but these are generally less severe than with other similar drugs.

Synthesis

The Claisen-Schmidt condensation between 3-(methoxymethoxy)benzaldehyde [13709-05-2] (1) and cyclohexanone (2) afforded CID:54364197 (3). Michael addition of dimethylamine leads the aminoketone, i.e. 2-[dimethylamino-[3-(methoxymethoxy)phenyl]methyl]cyclohexan-1-one, CID21518320. Reduction of the ketone proceeds stereospecifically to afford the cis aminoalcohol [51356-58-2] (4). Mild hydrolysis of the product gives the free phenol ciramadol (5).

See also 

 Bromadol
 C-8813
 Faxeladol
 Profadol
 Tapentadol
 Tramadol

References 

Synthetic opioids
Mu-opioid receptor agonists
Phenols
Cyclohexanols
Dimethylamino compounds